Cophomantella furnaria is a moth in the family Lecithoceridae. It was described by Edward Meyrick in 1913. It is known from South Africa.

The wingspan is 12–13 mm. The forewings are dark fuscous with a whitish-ochreous antemedian fascia, straight and sharply defined anteriorly, broadly suffused posteriorly, followed by a blackish-fuscous discal dot. The posterior area is lighter and somewhat sprinkled with whitish ochreous, with a whitish-ochreous line running from the costa about three-fourths to the dorsum before the tornus, angulated inwards above the middle and outwards in the middle, well-defined anteriorly but more or less suffused posteriorly, forming a spot or patch on the costa. The hindwings are whitish ochreous, more or less infuscated (darkened) towards the apex.

References

Endemic moths of South Africa
Moths described in 1913
Cophomantella
Taxa named by Edward Meyrick